Alex Muyl (born September 30, 1995) is an American professional soccer player who plays as a winger for Nashville SC in Major League Soccer.

Early career
Muyl was raised by French immigrant parents in Manhattan, New York and attended Bard High School Early College on the Lower East Side. Muyl played in the New York Red Bulls Academy system and later trained with the U.S. national team residency program at Bradenton. While with the Red Bulls' academy, Muyl won two national championships as a member of the U-16 and U-18 squads, and was the team's top scorer during both seasons. He played at college level for three years at Georgetown University, appearing in 62 matches scoring 12 goals and tallying 25 assists. He led the team in assists in each of his three seasons.

Professional

New York Red Bulls
On December 22, 2015, Muyl signed a Homegrown Contract with the New York Red Bulls. He joined former Georgetown teammate, Brandon Allen and former academy and New York Red Bulls II players, Derrick Etienne and Tyler Adams as the fourth homegrown player signing in the 2015 season. Muyl made his professional debut for New York Red Bulls II on March 26, appearing as a starter in a 2–2 draw against Toronto FC II.

On April 9 against Sporting Kansas City; Muyl made his first MLS appearance coming on in the 85th minute for Dax McCarty. The following day he scored his first goal as a professional, helping New York Red Bulls II to a 4–0 victory over Bethlehem Steel FC. During a 4–0 victory against FC Dallas on April 29; Muyl recorded his first MLS assist, setting up Felipe for the final goal of the match. Muyl scored his first MLS goal in a 7–0 Hudson River Derby victory against New York City FC on May 21, 2016. He was the first player from the New York metropolitan area to score in the derby. On June 15, he made his first U.S. Open Cup appearance in a 1–0 victory against the Rochester Rhinos. After a strong defensive effort in the Hudson River Derby, Muyl was voted to his first ever MLS Team of the Week appearance. He was lauded by many for shutting down Jack Harrison and played a crucial role in the Red Bulls' 4–1 victory. Sports Illustrated also recognized Muyl for his performance and named his as their Defensive Player of the Week. On August 3, Muyl made his first CONCACAF Champions League appearance and scored his first goal in the competition in a 3–0 victory against Antigua GFC.

Nashville SC
On August 13, 2020, Muyl was traded to Nashville SC in exchange for Nashville's 2020 and 2021 international picks, as well as an additional $50,000 in General Allocation Money in 2021 if Muyl meets certain performance-based metrics.

International
In 2013, Muyl was named to the United States U-18 squad to participate in the 2013 Milk Cup in Northern Ireland. He has also been called into the U-20 and U-23 camps and was part of the residency program.

Career statistics

Honors
New York Red Bulls II
USL Cup: 2016

New York Red Bulls
MLS Supporters' Shield: 2018

References

External links

newyorkredbulls.com profile
guhoyas.com profile

1995 births
Living people
American soccer players
New York Red Bulls U-23 players
New York Red Bulls players
New York Red Bulls II players
Nashville SC players
Association football midfielders
USL League Two players
Major League Soccer players
USL Championship players
United States men's youth international soccer players
Soccer players from New York City
Georgetown Hoyas men's soccer players
American people of French descent
Homegrown Players (MLS)